North Canberra, also known as the Inner North, is a district of Canberra, the capital city of Australia, comprising 14 suburbs. Many of Canberra's oldest dwellings are in this district.

North Canberra is located from the north and east of Canberra's City, to the north of Lake Burley Griffin and west of Mount Majura and south of Mount Ainslie, and is bounded to the north by the Barton Highway and Federal Highway.

It is one of the oldest parts of Canberra and is built in part in accordance to Griffin's designs.

Places of note and interest
 Civic is the major shopping and office precinct in Canberra.  
 Russell has the main headquarters of the Australian Defence Force.
 The Australian National University has its campus in the suburb of Acton and the Australian Defence Force Academy and Royal Military College, Duntroon are in the suburb of Campbell. 
 The Australian War Memorial is also located in Campbell.

Demographics
Aboriginal and Torres Strait Islander people made up 1.4% of the population, which was lower than the national and territory averages. The median age of people in North Canberra was 31 years, which was lower than the national median of 38 years. Children aged 0–14 years made up 12.0% of the population and people aged 65 years and over made up 11.2% of the population. Of people in the area aged 15 years and over, 31.9% were married and 8.4% were either divorced or separated.

When compared with total population growth of Australia for the same periods, being 5.8%, 8.3%, 8.8% and 8.6% respectively, population growth in North Canberra was faster than the national average. The median weekly income for residents within North Canberra in 2021 was significantly higher than the national average, and slightly below the territory average.

Representation
North Canberra is represented by:
 ACT Legislative Assembly: The Australian Capital Territory (ACT) was granted self-government by the Commonwealth Parliament in 1988 with the passage of the Australian Capital Territory (Self-Government) Act 1988. The first Assembly was elected in 1989.  There are currently 25 members of the Legislative Assembly (MLAs). Members are elected every four years by the people of the ACT to represent them and make decisions on their behalf.  The ACT Legislative Assembly  has five multi-member electorates: Yerrabi; Ginninderra; Kurrajong; Murrumbidgee and; Brindabella, each electing five members.
 North Canberra Community Council:  North Canberra Community Council (NCCC)  is recognised by the ACT Government as a peak community body representing the interests of the local residents, businesses and organisations within the Inner North region of Canberra with the ACT Government. The NCCC is not a local government.

References

External links

 Canberra region map - all districts

Districts of the Australian Capital Territory